Pochazia is a genus of true bugs belonging to the family Ricaniidae.

The species of this genus are found in Africa and Southeastern Asia.

Species

Fulgoromorpha Lists on the Web and GBIF include:
 Pochazia 5-costatus Signoret, 1860
 Pochazia albomaculata (Uhler, 1896)
 Pochazia angulata (Kirby, 1891)
 Pochazia antica (Gray, 1832)
 Pochazia antigone Kirkaldy, 1902
 Pochazia anwari Shakila, 1984
 Pochazia atkinsoni Distant, 1906
 Pochazia aurulenta Distant, 1909
 Pochazia barbara Melichar, 1898
 Pochazia biperforata Signoret, 1860
 Pochazia chienfengensis Chou & Lu, 1977
 Pochazia citri Shakila, 1984
 Pochazia confusa Distant, 1906
 Pochazia convergens Walker, 1857
 Pochazia crocata Melichar, 1898
 Pochazia discreta Melichar, 1898
 Pochazia dohrni Schmidt, 1905
 Pochazia emarginata (Walker, 1857)
 Pochazia facialis Kato, 1934
 Pochazia fasciata (Spinola, 1839) - type species
 Pochazia fasciatifrons (Stål, 1870)
 Pochazia fumata (Amyot & Audinet-Serville, 1843)
 Pochazia funebris Stål, 1865
 Pochazia funerea Melichar, 1912
 Pochazia gradiens Walker, 1857
 Pochazia guttifera Walker, 1851
 Pochazia inclyta Walker, 1870
 Pochazia incompleta Melichar, 1898
 Pochazia interrupta Walker, 1851
 Pochazia mamyona Distant, 1916
 Pochazia marginalis Melichar, 1914
 Pochazia nigropunctata Signoret, 1860
 Pochazia papuana Kirkaldy, 1909
 Pochazia quinqueplagiata Schmidt, 1911
 Pochazia rufifrons Melichar, 1923
 Pochazia shantungensis (Chou & Lu, 1977)
 Pochazia sinuata Stål, 1865
 Pochazia subatomaria (Walker, 1870)
 Pochazia subflava Distant, 1909
 Pochazia transversa Melichar, 1898
 Pochazia triangularis Distant, 1906
 Pochazia trinitatis Chou & Lu, 1977
 Pochazia umbrata Melichar, 1898
 Pochazia zizzata Chou & Lu, 1977

References

Ricaniidae
Hemiptera of Africa
Hemiptera of Asia